Mysterious Mr. Sabin is a 1898 spy thriller novel by the British writer E. Phillips Oppenheim. It was the first spy novel by Oppenheim, a genre which he came to dominate during the First World War and interwar era. Revolving around a plot of a Frenchman selling British military secrets it became a bestseller, establishing him as a popular writer. It has been described as the novel "that launched Oppenheim's career of xenophobic espionage fantasy". It contains elements of invasion fiction, a common genre theme at the time.

Synopsis 
A ruthless French criminal mastermind, Sabin plots to restore the French monarchy and place his niece Hélène on the throne. To accomplish this he steals various military secrets in a complex plan that involves a German invasion of Britain. He is thwarted by a young Englishman Lord Wolfenden who eventually ends up marrying Hélène.

References

Bibliography
 Miskimmin, Esme. 100 British Crime Writers. Springer Nature, 2020.
 Panek, LeRoy. The Special Branch: The British Spy Novel, 1890-1980. Popular Press, 1981.
 Reilly, John M. Twentieth Century Crime & Mystery Writers. Springer, 2015.
 Wark, Wesley K. Spy Fiction, Spy Films and Real Intelligence. Routledge, 2013.
 Server, Lee. Encyclopedia of Pulp Fiction Writers. Infobase Publishing, 2014. 
 Sutherland, John. The Longman Companion to Victorian Fiction. Routledge, 2014.

1898 British novels
Novels by E. Phillips Oppenheim
British thriller novels
British spy novels
Ward, Lock & Co. books
Novels set in England